Titeltbukta (English: Ten Tents Bay) is a bay on the northwestern coast of the Norwegian island of Jan Mayen. The name originates from the establishment of ten "tents", in reality wood and brick structures, as a basic whaling station. This was set up in 1624 by Dutch whalers to lodge the men who flensed (cut up) the whales.  The Dutch also called it Zuidbaai (South Bay), in contrast to the other on the island, to the north at Engelskbukta).

References

 Hacquebord, Lawrens. (2004). The Jan Mayen Whaling Industry. Its Exploitation of the Greenland Right Whale and its Impact on the Marine Ecosystem. In: S. Skreslet (ed.), Jan Mayen in Scientific Focus. Amsterdam, Kluwer Academic Publishers. 229–238.
 Norwegian Polar Institute Place Names of Svalbard Database

Landforms of Jan Mayen
Whaling stations in Norway
Bays of Norway